Tambja olivaria is a species of sea slug, a dorid nudibranch, a marine gastropod mollusk in the family Polyceridae.

Distribution
This species occurs in the Philippines, Maldives, Thailand, and Taiwan.

Description
Tambja olivaria is characterized by being mainly a dull olive color, hence the name.

References

 Pola M., Cervera J.L. & Gosliner T.M. (2006) Taxonomic revision and phylogenetic analysis of the genus Tambja Burn, 1962 (Mollusca, Nudibranchia, Polyceridae). Zoologica Scripta 35(5):491-530.

Polyceridae
Gastropods described in 1994